Håkan Andersson Rydin (born January 4, 1951 in Gislaved, Sweden), is a jazz pianist living in Malmö, Sweden.

With Jörgen Nilsson  – and later Ulf Rådelius and Anders Lagerlöf – he formed the jazz group (Swedish) Nexus, which during its existence between 1972 and 1992 performed over 1000 concerts. They made three highly accomplished records and performed on international jazz festivals, in radio and TV in several counties.

Between 1988 and 2003 Rydin played with American singer Kim Parker, the stepdaughter of the jazz legend Charlie "Bird" Parker, all over the world.

The piano style of Håkan Rydin has been described as "lyrical and cooking" and he has performed with Thad Jones, Pepper Adams, Red Mitchell, Etta Cameron, Enrico Rava, Tim Hagans, Georgie Fame, David Liebman and Swedish Jazz stars like Jan Allan, Arne Domnérus, Helge Albin, Anders Bergcrantz, Christer Boustedt, Bernt Rosengren and Svante Thuresson.

In recent years Rydin has mostly performed in the classical piano trio format (piano, bass and drums). 2010 he was the first jazz musician to perform in the Great Theatre (NCPA) in Beijing.

Rydin has published two books (in Swedish) on playing piano by ear, with colleague Dage Jonsson.

2013–2018 he was Professor of Jazz Piano at the Malmö Academy of Music.

Discography

As a leader or co-leader 
 2020 – Nexus in Montreal (AdOpen)
 2019 – Melodies... (AdOpen)
 2007 – A Splendored Thing with Elisabeth Melander (Sittel)
 2005 – Tender Silhouette (Marshmallow Records)
 1997 – A Beautiful Friendship with Kim Parker (FLC)
 1987 – Nexus in Canada (FLC)
 1984 – Nexus meets Enrico Rava (FLC)
 1978 – Nexus (FLC)
 1978 – Nexus First (SweDisc Jazz)

Other recordings 
 2017 – Elisabeth Melander: "Reflections of a Voice" (Prophone)
 2003 – Lasse O: "A Tribute to Red" with Red Mitchell (hi-hat records)
 2002 – Gitte Pålsson & Håkan Rydin: "Novemberljus" (GPCD)
 1999 – Ulf Rådelius: "Connection" (URCD)
 1979 – Lasse O: "Speglingar" (GoodWill)

References

External links 
 Official homepage: www.hakanrydin.com
 Lund University, Malmö Academy of Music: www.lu.se/o.o.i.s/17003

1951 births
Living people

Swedish jazz pianists

People from Gislaved Municipality
Musicians from Malmö
21st-century pianists